Adductor obliquus may refer to:

 Adductor hallucis muscle (adductor obliquus hallucis)
 Adductor pollicis muscle (adductor obliquus pollicis)